Simona Halep was the defending champion and successfully defended her title, defeating Kristina Mladenovic in the final, 7–5, 6–7(5–7), 6–2.

As a result of Serena Williams' withdrawal due to pregnancy, Angelique Kerber regained the WTA no. 1 ranking at the end of the tournament, but retired due to a thigh injury in the third round against Eugenie Bouchard.

Seeds

Draw

Finals

Top half

Section 1

Section 2

Bottom half

Section 3

Section 4

Qualifying

Seeds

Qualifiers

Lucky loser

Draw

First qualifier

Second qualifier

Third qualifier

Fourth qualifier

Fifth qualifier

Sixth qualifier

Seventh qualifier

Eighth qualifier

References
 Main Draw
 Qualifying Draw

Women's - Singles